The EMD SD75M and EMD SD75I are a series of similar diesel-electric locomotives produced by General Motors Electro-Motive Division between 1994 and 1996. The series was a response to General Electric's Dash 9-44CW. The "M" in the model designation is the style of the cab, in this case the North American style cab.

The "I" model has an "Isolated Cab", or a "WhisperCab" in EMD speak, which reduces noise and vibration in the cab. This type of cab is recognized by a seam separating the nose and cab components. This seam is the rubber that damps vibration and cuts down on noise, because the cab is not attached directly to the frame on the unit. This was the last model that used the "I" designation in the model name; all further units had the isolated cab, but the model designation continued to use the "M". Buyers included Canadian National, the largest buyer with 175 units (now 173), Burlington Northern Santa Fe with 26 (now 24), and Ontario Northland Railway with 6 (now 5).

Both models use the HTCR radial truck and are mounted on the  frame.  This M model only sold 76 units and was not as popular as the SD70.  The biggest buyer of this model was the Atchison, Topeka and Santa Fe Railway, now Burlington Northern Santa Fe, with 51 units; an additional 25 were delivered in early 1996, during the merger process. The Santa Fe's SD75Ms were the railroad's last new locomotives, with the last new unit, number 250, built in August 1995.

Mainly built for a special request from Santa Fe/BNSF, the SD75Ms are slightly more powerful than SD70Ms, having horsepower ratings between  & 4500 hp. They are almost identical to SD70Ms, but can be distinguished by the added bulge below the inertial air-intake on the right side of the unit.

In September 2014, Norfolk Southern purchased 7 SD75Ms via National Railway Equipment Company.

SD75M operators

SD75I Operators

SD75I gallery

References

External links

 Locomotive Truck EMD HTCR

SD75M
C-C locomotives
Diesel-electric locomotives of the United States
Freight locomotives